The 1997 Austrian Grand Prix (formally the Grosser Preis von Österreich 1997) was a Formula One motor race held at the A1-Ring on 21 September 1997. It was the fourteenth race of the 1997 Formula One World Championship, and the first Austrian Grand Prix since 1987.

The 71-lap race was won by Canadian driver Jacques Villeneuve, driving a Williams-Renault, after he started from pole position. Italian Jarno Trulli led the first half of the race in his Prost-Mugen-Honda, but later retired with an engine failure. Briton David Coulthard finished second in a McLaren-Mercedes, with Villeneuve's German teammate Heinz-Harald Frentzen third.

Villeneuve's rival for the Drivers' Championship, German Michael Schumacher, could only manage sixth in his Ferrari, allowing Villeneuve to close to within one point of him with three races remaining.

Report
Qualifying threw up a few surprises, as the Bridgestone tyres used by several smaller teams proved strong, but it was ultimately Jacques Villeneuve who won. Mika Häkkinen had been leading Villeneuve after the start but his engine failed yet again, before he even managed to complete the first lap. Jarno Trulli lead the early laps as a result, and was running 2nd (though still needing to make another pitstop) when his engine also failed and left oil out the track, which caused Rubens Barrichello to spin out of the race in the closing laps as a result.

A spectacular collision occurred between Eddie Irvine and Jean Alesi. As they battled for 4th place on lap 37, Alesi tried to outbrake Irvine into the chicane from approximately eight car-lengths behind, and as Irvine took evasive action, the Frenchman drove into the Northern Irishman's car at such speed that Alesi's car went over the top of Irvine's while the latter was pitched into a spin. Alesi was placed under investigation by the stewards for dangerous driving after the race, although no charges were formally brought against either driver.

Michael Schumacher ran as high as 3rd, but received a stop-go penalty for overtaking Heinz-Harald Frentzen under yellow flags. Schumacher claimed he had not seen them, and that they were not visible on the inside of the corner.

Austrian Formula One veteran Gerhard Berger announced he was to retire at the end of the season, shortly after he qualified 18th on the grid.

Classification

Qualifying

Notes
 Tarso Marques was excluded from taking part in the race after his car was found to be underweight after qualifying.

Race

Championship standings after the race

Drivers' Championship standings

Constructors' Championship standings

References

Austrian Grand Prix
Grand Prix
Austrian Grand Prix
Austrian Grand Prix